Scopelarchoides is a genus of pearleyes.

Species
There are currently five recognized species in this genus:
 Scopelarchoides climax R. K. Johnson, 1974
 Scopelarchoides danae R. K. Johnson, 1974 (Dana pearleye)
 Scopelarchoides kreffti R. K. Johnson, 1972 (Twin-striped pearleye)
 Scopelarchoides nicholsi A. E. Parr, 1929
 Scopelarchoides signifer R. K. Johnson, 1974

References

Aulopiformes